The 1989 Pro Bowl was the NFL's 39th annual all-star game which featured the outstanding performers from the 1988 season. The game was played on Sunday, January 29, 1989, at Aloha Stadium in Honolulu, Hawaii before a crowd of 50,113. The final score was NFC 34, AFC 3.

Marv Levy of the Buffalo Bills led the AFC team against an NFC team coached by Chicago Bears head coach Mike Ditka. The referee was Ben Dreith.

Randall Cunningham of the Philadelphia Eagles was named the game's MVP. Players on the winning NFC team received $10,000 apiece while the AFC participants each took home $5,000.

It was the last Pro Bowl game played in January for two decades, until the 2010 Pro Bowl.

AFC roster

Offense

Defense

Special teams

NFC roster
The players representing the NFC were:

Offense

Defense

Special teams

References

External links

Pro Bowl
Pro Bowl
Pro Bowl
Pro Bowl
Pro Bowl
American football competitions in Honolulu
January 1989 sports events in the United States
January 1989 sports events in Oceania